The Procedure is a New Jersey band that formed in 2001. The band features former Thursday and Purpose guitarist Bill Henderson.

History 
The Procedure formed in 2001 at The College of New Jersey in Trenton, NJ.  The band self-released a 4-song demo in 2002 and began performing in and around New Jersey.  In early 2003 they released a 7" on Warmachine Records before signing to Brightside/Blackout! Records that spring and releasing their first full length, Rise of New Reason in September 2003.  They temporarily disbanded in 2004 after the departure of drummer Mike Donatelli, but he returned to the band the next year and they resumed working on their second LP, Shift Pacific.  In 2008, they recorded their third full length, The Ancestor's Tale, which was released on February 26, 2009 on the band's own Eyeset World Records.

Members 
 Mike Donatelli - drums
 Frank Fenimore - Guitar
 Bill Henderson - Guitar, vocals
 Jon “Big Daddy” Tarella - Bass 2008–Present
 Ed Adams - Bass 2001–2007
 Jesse Traynor - vocals

Discography & album descriptions

External links 
 Official Band Web Site
 Procedure Myspace page

American post-hardcore musical groups
Musical groups from New Jersey